Carola Hansson-Boëthius (born 7 September 1942) is a Swedish novelist, dramatist and translator.

Biography
Born in Stockholm, Carola Hansson studied Russian and history of art and literature at Uppsala University. Together with Karin Lindén, she authored her first work in 1980, Samtal med kvinnor i Moskva, translated into English as Moscow Women: Thirteen Interviews, published in 1983. 

Hansson's first novel, Det drömda barnet (The Dream Child) was published in 1983, presenting the feelings of fear and longing she experienced in childhood and which typify her later works, especially Pojken från Jerusalem (1986), De två trädgårdarna (1989) and Resan till det blå huset (1991). She became widely recognized in 1994 with Andrej, a novel about the Tolstoy family, which was well received by the critics. Her most recent work, Med ett namn som mitt (With a Name like Mine, 2009), follows on from Andrej in an episode based on a meeting between the author and someone who claims to have known Tolstoy's son, Ilya Tolstoy.

Bibliography
 Samtal med kvinnor i Moskva 1980 (non-fiction, authored together with Karin Lidén)
 Kvinnan och Ryssland 1981 (non-fiction with Karin Lidén)
 Det drömda barnet, novel, 1983
 Stilleben i vitt, novel,  1985
 Pojken från Jerusalem, novel, 1987
 De två trädgårdarna, novel, 1989
 Resan till det blå huset, novel, 1991
 Steinhof, novel, 1997,
 Den älskvärde, novel. 2000
 Mästarens dröm, novel, 2005
  Leo Tolstoy's family trilogy:
 Andrej, novel, 1994
 Med ett namn som mitt, 2009
 Masja, 2015

Awards
Hansson has received several awards including the Swedish Radio Novel Prize in 1995 and the Dobloug Prize in 2006.

References

External links
Carola Hansson's website

1942 births
Living people
Dobloug Prize winners
Swedish women novelists
Swedish translators
Women dramatists and playwrights
Writers from Stockholm
20th-century Swedish women writers
20th-century Swedish novelists
21st-century Swedish women writers
20th-century translators
21st-century Swedish novelists